3-Aminopyridine is an aminopyridine. It is a colorless solid.

Preparation 
3-Aminopyridine is prepared by heating nicotinamide with sodium hypobromite which is in turn prepared in situ by the reaction of sodium hydroxide and bromine at 70 °C.

It can be used in the synthesis of organic ligand 3-pyridylnicotinamide. Troxipide is another synthesis that uses 3-AP.

Toxicity
The acute toxicity is indicated by the LD50 = 178 mg/kg (quail, oral).

References 

Aminopyridines
3-Pyridyl compounds